The Roman Catholic Diocese of Tunduru–Masasi is a diocese located in Tunduru–Masasi in the Ecclesiastical province of Songea in Tanzania.

History
 October 17, 1986: Established by the Holy See as Diocese of Tunduru – Masasi after suppressing the Diocese of Nachingwea
The diocese has an area covering 22,730 square kilometers. 
GEOGRAPHICAL BOUNDARIES TUNDURU-MASASI; In the East region borders with the diocese of Mtwara, the Northeast diocese of Lindi, Mozambique  to the South, to the West the Archdiocese of Songea. There are now 24 local priests, 19 parishes. The diocese is in the extreme Southern part of Tanzania marking the border between Tanzania and Mozambique. It is surrounded by is Selous game reserve.

Bishops

Ordinaries
 Bishops of Tunduru–Masasi (Roman rite)
 Bishop Polycarp Pengo (October 17, 1986 – January 22, 1990), appointed Coadjutor Archbishop of Dar-es-Salaam; future Cardinal 
 Bishop Magnus Mwalunyungu (March 30, 1992 – August 25, 2005)
 Bishop Castor Paul Msemwa (August 25, 2005 – October 19, 2017)
 Bishop Filbert Felician Mhasi (February 17, 2019 to date)

Coadjutor Bishop
Castor Paul Msemwa (2004-2005)

See also
Roman Catholicism in Tanzania

Sources
 GCatholic.org
 Catholic Hierarchy

Tunduru-Masasi
Christian organizations established in 1986
Roman Catholic dioceses and prelatures established in the 20th century
Tunduru-Masasi, Roman Catholic Diocese of
1986 establishments in Tanzania